Michael Molgano (born February 27, 1959) is an American politician who served in the Connecticut House of Representatives from the 144th district from 2011 to 2015.

References

1959 births
Living people
Republican Party members of the Connecticut House of Representatives